Colbert may refer to:

People

 Colbert (name), list of people with the name "Colbert". It most often refers to:
 Claudette Colbert (1903–1996), Oscar-winning French-American actress
 Jean-Baptiste Colbert (1619–1683), a Controller-General of Finances under the French king Louis XIV
 Stephen Colbert ( 1964), an American satirist and host of The Late Show with Stephen Colbert

Places
Colbert County, Alabama, United States
Colbert, Georgia, United States
Colbert, Oklahoma, United States
Colbert, Washington, United States
Colbert's Ferry, historic Red River crossing on the National Register of Historic Places, United States
Colbert Mountains, located on Alexander Island, Antarctica
Mount Colbert, Antarctic mountain in the Ross Dependency
Colbert Hills, golf course in Manhattan, Kansas, United States

Ships
French ship Colbert, six ships of the French Navy named in honour of Jean-Baptiste Colbert
Colbert-class ironclad, a class of warship used in the French Navy
USS Colbert (APA-145), United States Navy attack transport

Other
Comité Colbert, French social committee
 Combined Operational Load Bearing External Resistance Treadmill (C.O.L.B.E.R.T.), International Space Station exercise device named for Stephen Colbert
 Limerick railway station, Ireland, renamed Colbert Station in 1966 for Conn Colbert

See also
 Kolbert

French-language surnames